Niels Desein (born 9 June 1987) is a Belgian tennis player playing on the ATP Challenger Tour. He was born in Ghent, Belgium, and currently resides in Wondelgem, Belgium.

Juniors

Desein reached as high as No. 4 in the combined junior world rankings in May 2005.

Junior Slam results:

Australian Open: -
French Open: 1R (2005)
Wimbledon: 3R (2004, 2005)
US Open: 2R (2004)

Professional tour
His career-high ATP rankings are world No. 154 in singles in March 2015 and World No. 182 in doubles in August 2009. His favourite surface is clay.

He made his main draw debut on the ATP World Tour at the 2013 Portugal Open as a qualifier. He represented the Belgium Davis Cup team on one occasion in 2015.

Singles: 47 (27–20)

Doubles: 51 (32–19)

Performance timeline

Singles

References

External links
 
 
 
 

1987 births
Living people
Belgian male tennis players
Flemish sportspeople
Sportspeople from Ghent